Claude Le Péron (2 February 1948 – 24 June 2020) was a French bass guitarist known for his collaboration with Jean-Jacques Goldman among other musicians.

Biography 
He started playing guitar in 1961, then started the bass guitar in 1964. Not knowing how to read music, he taught himself by listening to records. He was influenced by The Beatles, The Rolling Stones and other rock bands of the 60s. In 1964, he bought his first bass, a replica of Paul McCartney's bass. In 1967, like many artists, he passed through Club Med as a musician.

He moved to Nantes in 1969, where he played in local bands with musicians such as Jacky Mascarel, and Philippe Grandvoinet (New Direction). While there, he founded the group Nantais Zig-Zag with Jean-Luc Chevalier (Tri Yann). He also played in the Crystal Group. In 1977, along with Mascarel, Le Péron got to know bassists Laurent Voulzy and Alain Souchon.

He went on to record "Cœur Grenadine" and "Bopper en larmes" with Voulzy, in 1979 and 1983. In 1983 he made "Olympia 83" with Souchon and Jacky Mascarel.

It was during that year, 1983, that he crossed paths with Jean-Jacques Goldman, during the "Champs Élysées" show. Following the broadcast, Jean-Jacques Goldman decided to go on tour and needed a bassist who could sing. This led him to add Le Péron to his band. He and other Goldman band members worked with Michael Jones, drummer Jean-François Gautier and the Rhinos.

Le Péron toured with Goldman and collaborated on many of his albums from that time until Goldman's last tour in 2002. Since that time, he has toured with Michael Jones and in groups such as Les Rapalas and After The Rain.

Discography

with Laurent Voulzy 
 1979 : Cœur Grenadine
 1983 : Bopper en Larmes

with Alain Souchon 
 1983 : Olympia 83

with Jean-Jacques Goldman 
 1985 : Non homologué – Bass on "Je Te Donne"
 1987 : Entre gris clair et gris foncé – Bass on "Peur De Rien Blues"
 1986 : En Public
 1989 : Traces
 1991 : L'Intégrale 81/91
 1992 : Sur Scène
 1995 : Du New Morning au Zénith
 1996 : Singulier 81/89
 1999 : Tournée 1998 En Passant
 2000 : L'Intégrale 90/00
 2003 : Un Tour Ensemble
 2008 : La collection 81–89

with Michael Jones 
 1997 : A consommer sans modération

References

External links
 

1948 births
2020 deaths
People from Fontenay-sous-Bois
French bass guitarists
Male bass guitarists
French male guitarists